KBYR (700 AM) is an American commercial radio station programming talk in Anchorage, Alaska. 700 AM is a North American clear-channel frequency. WLW in Cincinnati, Ohio is also a Class A station on this frequency.

History
Longtime Alaskan broadcaster Dick Lobdell identified KBYR as the source of the famous Alaskan blooper presented on Kermit Schaefer's blooper albums of an announcer declaring that he would be "taking a leak out the window" to determine how cold it was.

KBYR was originally on 1240 kHz. It moved to 1270 in 1956 then to 700 in 1971.

Translators
In addition to the main station, KBYR is relayed by an additional 2 translators to widen its broadcast area.

References

External links

FCC History Cards for KBYR
KBYR history introduced by Rod Williams

1948 establishments in Alaska
Radio stations established in 1948
BYR
Talk radio stations in the United States